Ersekë, is a town and a former municipality in southeastern Albania. At the 2015 local government reform it became a subdivision and the seat of the municipality Kolonjë. Founded in the 17th century, Erseka was the seat of the former Kolonjë District. The population at the 2011 census was 3,746. Situated at the foot of the Gramos mountains, it is a small alpine town at 1050 meters in altitude, making it one of the highest towns in Albania.

History
 
The history of the town began during the 17th century. In 1785 the city was populated by 100 families. In 1914 it came under the control of the Northern Epirote forces, which repelled the newly established Albanian gendarmerie units from the region.

On 21 November 1940, during the Greco-Italian War, units of the II Army Corps of the advancing Greek forces entered Ersekë after breaching the Italian defences.

Culture, music and arts
The "Fan Stilian Noli" center hosts several artistic and cultural shows throughout the year. Its main theater of 400 seats hosts performances by various groups from Korçë, Tirana and local artists. The ethnographic museum also houses a collection of traditional costumes, textiles and other crafts, unique to the Erseka region.

In the center of the town is an obelisk, work of Odhise Paskali, which dates 28 November 1938.

Economy, agriculture

Erseka-Kolonja is known for its apple production throughout Albania. Of the 133 hectares allocated to orchards, 119 is set aside for apple farms, producing about 947 tons a year. With over 1300 hectares of productive land still unused, fruit tree farmers are trained and familiar with apple agro-technology and have received fruit saplings from countries like Greece and North Macedonia. There are two nurseries that produce saplings for apples, yielding 800 saplings a year.

The region is also known for its honey production. Formed a few years ago, the Beekeeping Association consists of 70 beekeepers and produces 4000 kg of honey a year. With over 3080 hectares used for farming, the region yields about 4500 tons of cereal grain, 2350 tons of wheat and 2080 tons of corn a year. About 66,000 tons of alfalfa and forage crops are produced, which are used for livestock cultivation. The region has three wheat factories for milling, including five centers for mass bread production. In addition, medical plants can be found in the region. Currently they are cultivated and gathered privately.

With the region's vast pasture land, the quality of the region's livestock production is high. Erseka-Kolonja farmers currently breed about 5500 cattle, 4200 cows, 40,000 sheep and 22,000 goats. Its livestock produces about 98,500 kv of milk a year and 1451 tons of meat. Last year, farmers worked with UPRA, France and SBI Korce. They imported Tanranteze cattle stock, which has led to increases in the production of milk and meat. Erseka has one milk/cheese factory and several points of collection and treatment of milk.

There are 250 businesses registered with the municipality. There are 6 construction firms, 16 transportation firms and a private bus company. Erseka is also renowned for its woodcrafts, stone carving and carpet weaving tradition.

Sports
The football club KS Gramozi Ersekë founded in 1927 and its stadium is Ersekë Stadium with a capacity of 10,000 and 2,000 seats. The club has had a successful history in its past. It went to the Albanian Superliga at the end of 2008-09 season defeating Bylis Ballsh 5-2 in the playoff. In 2010 they played against Real Madrid for the Taçi Oil cup in Tirane end up 2-1 for Real Madrid.

Notable people
Petro Dode, communist politician
Thoma Kaçori, politician
Shahin Kolonja, nationalist
Anastas Lula, communist politician of World War II
Petro Nini Luarasi, clergyman and nationalist activist
Skender Petro Luarasi, writer
Sevasti Qiriazi-Dako, educator
Agim Qirjaqi, actor
Fehim Zavalani, journalist and nationalist
Tajar Zavalani, journalist
Dhori Qirjazi, poet
Kastriot Frashëri, Hon. publicist, researcher, founder of civil society and Lawyer
Uran Butka, MP, researcher and democrat politician
Ylli Rakipi, journalist

References

External links
Erseka

Former municipalities in Korçë County
Administrative units of Kolonjë, Korçë
Towns in Albania